The 2018–19 Botswana First Division North was the 54th season of the Botswana First Division North football league since its inception in 1966. It was played from October to May instead of the usual August to May due to delays in the conclusion of a television broadcasting deal. TAFIC were crowned champions.

Team summaries

Teams promoted to Botswana Premier League
TAFIC

Teams promoted from Botswana Division One

Teams relegated to Botswana Division One
Palapye All-Stars
Real Movers

Stadiums and locations

League table

References

Football in Botswana